Raffaele Costa Storti (born 19 December 2000) is a Portuguese rugby union player, who plays for Stade Français.

Club career
Having played for CR Técnico until 2019, Storti then joined the new Peñarol Rugby franchise in Uruguay. But just after he made his debut in the Súper Liga Americana, the league was quickly brought to a halt because of the Covid-19 pandemic, and the young Portuguese returned to his former club in his home country, to compete in the 2020-2021 season.

On the 31 August 2021, he signed for the Top 14 side Stade Français.

International career
A standout player at the 2019 under-20 Trophy with Portugal, scoring the most tries in the competition, Storti quickly became part of the senior team, appearing to be one of rugby union most promising prospects outside of Tier 1 nations.

References

External links

CDP profile

2000 births
Living people
Portuguese rugby union players
Portugal international rugby union players
Stade Français players
Rugby union wings
Peñarol Rugby players